The Louisville Open is a defunct Grand Prix and WCT affiliated men's tennis tournament played from 1970 to 1979. It was held in Louisville, Kentucky in the United States and played on outdoor hard courts in 1970 and on outdoor clay courts from 1971 to 1979.

Guillermo Vilas was the most successful player at the tournament, winning the singles competition three times and the doubles competition once with Pole Wojciech Fibak.

Results

Singles

Doubles

References

External links
 ATP results archive

 
Hard court tennis tournaments
Clay court tennis tournaments
Defunct tennis tournaments in the United States
Grand Prix tennis circuit
World Championship Tennis
Recurring sporting events established in 1970
Recurring sporting events disestablished in 1979
1970 establishments in Kentucky
1979 disestablishments in Kentucky